Lasioglossum aulacophorum, also known as the Lasioglossum (Sudila) aulacophorum, is a species of bee in the genus Lasioglossum, of the family Halictidae.

References

aulacophorum
Insects described in 1913